A lama is a Tibetan teacher of the Dharma.

Lama or LAMA may also refer to:

Music 
 Lama (Japanese band)
 Lama (Ukrainian band)

Names
 Lama (surname), includes list of name-holders
 Lama (name), an Arabic given name

People 
 Lamá (Angolan footballer) (born 1981)
 Lamá (Mozambican footballer) (born 1985)

Places 
 Mount Lama, Victoria Land, Antarctica
 Lama Upazila, Bandarban District, Bangladesh
 Lama Passage, a strait on the British Columbia coast, Canada
 Lama, Haute-Corse, a commune in France
 Lama-ye Olya, Kohgiluyeh and Boyer-Ahmad Province, Iran
 Lama-ye Sofla, Kohgiluyeh and Boyer-Ahmad Province, Iran
 Johor Lama, a village in Johor, Malaysia
 Lama (Barcelos), a parish in Portugal
 Lama (Santo Tirso), a parish in Portugal
 Lama (river), a river in Russia
 Lake Lama, a lake in Russia
 Lema, California or La-ma, a former settlement in the U.S.

Plants and animals 
 Lama (genus), the genus of the llama and the guanaco
 Diospyros sandwicensis, a tree endemic to Hawaii
 Diospyros hillebrandii, a tree endemic to Hawaii

Other uses 
 Lama (geology), a term to denote a wide furrow in the ground typical of the Murge landscape 
 Lama clan (Tamang), an ethnic clan of Tamang peoples 
 Lama language, a language in Togo and Benin
 Lama language (Burma)
 Aérospatiale SA 315B Lama, a helicopter
 Lamassu or Lama, the goddess of intercession in ancient Sumer
 Lama Foundation, a commune in New Mexico, United States
 Latin American Motorcycle Association
 Legal Assistant Management Association, now the International Paralegal Management Association
 Local Automatic Message Accounting, a type of Automatic Message Accounting
 Long-acting muscarinic antagonist
 Los Angeles Music Academy
 Lama (HBC vessel), operated by the HBC from 1832-1837, see Hudson's Bay Company vessels

See also 
 Lama Lama (disambiguation)
 Lamas (disambiguation)
 Lamma (disambiguation)
 Lammas
 Llama (disambiguation)